Travels in the Scriptorium is a novel by Paul Auster first published in 2007.

Elements from most past Auster novels all converge in this book: every character other than the protagonist, Mr. Blank, is taken from a previous novel, with yet more characters mentioned peripherally.

Plot

An old man is disoriented within an unknown chamber and has no memory about who he is or how he has arrived there. He tries to understand something from the relics on the desk, examining the circumstances of his confinement and searching for reasons and a method to exit.

Determining that he is locked in, the man — identified only as Mr. Blank — begins reading a manuscript he finds on the desk, the story of another prisoner, set in an alternate world the man doesn't recognize. Nevertheless, the pages seem to have been left for him, along with a haunting set of photographs. As the day passes, various characters call on the man in his cell — vaguely familiar people, some who seem to resent him for crimes he can't remember — and each brings frustrating hints of his identity and his past. All the while an overhead camera clicks and clicks, recording his movements, and a microphone records every sound in the room. Someone is watching.

See also
 Scriptorium
 Waiting for the Barbarians

Reviews
 "Mr Writer Man": a review in the TLS by Deborah Friedell, October 2006.
 Travels in the Scriptorium by Paul Auster, Strange Horizons
"Sure Shot, or a Round of Blanks?": a review for WritersNewsWeekly.com by Jeff LeJeune, May 2008.

2007 American novels
Novels by Paul Auster
Henry Holt and Company books
Metafictional novels